The hairy big-eyed bat (Chiroderma villosum) is a bat species from South and Central America.

References

Chiroderma
Bats of Central America
Bats of South America
Bats of Brazil
Mammals described in 1860
Taxa named by Wilhelm Peters